The list below contains threatened mammals that dwell in or migrate to any region in Europe, the East Atlantic Ocean, and any nearby islands of the Atlantic Ocean. This includes mammals that are found in the East Atlantic Ocean (Azores), Iceland, the Adriatic Sea, the Sea of Azov, the Black and Caspian Sea, Corsica, Cyprus, Palearctic, Russia, Eurasia, North African Coast, the Mediterranean Sea and islands located in the Mediterranean Sea, and the islands of Spain (Canary, Balearic). The list below was compiled from data on the IUCN Red List of Endangered Species (IUCN). The International Union for Conservation of Nature   identifies species in need of attention before approaching extinction and works to increase prevention of extinction. The list below includes vulnerable (VU), endangered (EN), critically endangered (CR), and recently extinct (EX) species.

See also
Endangered plants of Europe
IUCN Red List

References

.Threatened
.M
Threatened
Europe
Biota of Europe by conservation status
Mammals,Europe